Narayanrao Bodas (नारायणराव बोडस) was an Indian classical vocalist from Maharashtra, belonging to the Gwalior gharana (singing style). He was also a leading vocalist of Marathi stage drama.

Plays acted
 Soubhagyarama सौभाग्यरमा
 Sangeet Sharda संगीत शारदा 
 Sangeet Saubhadram संगीत सौभद्रम्
 Mrichakatika मृच्छकटिक
 Sangeet Mruchchakatik  सं. मृच्छकटिक
  पती गेले गं काठेवाडी
  बुद्ध तिथे हरला
 Sangeet Mahashweta सं. महाश्वेता
 Sangeet Manapman संगीत मानापमान
 Sangeet Swayamvar सं. स्वयंवर
 Sangeet Saubhadra सं. सौभद्र
 Sangeet Samshay kallol सं. संशयकल्लोळ
 Dhadila Ramtine ka vani? धाडिला राम तिने का वनी?
  सुंदर मी होणार
 Sangeet Mandarmala मंदारमाला
 Sangeet Suvarnatula सुवर्णतुला
 Bawankhani बावनखणी
  संत गोरा कुंभार
  लहानपण देगा देवा
  देव दीनाघरी धावला
  तो एक राजहंस
 Krushnarjunyuddha कृष्णार्जुनयुद्ध

Personal life 
Narayanrao is survived by his family, including son Kedar Bodas, who is also a singer from the Gwalior gharana.

Illness and death 
Bodas died on 27 November 2017 at 7:40 am due to old age, at his home in Pune.

Awards and recognitions 
 Maharashtra State Government - Balgandharva award

References 

1922 births
2017 deaths
Hindustani singers
Singers from Maharashtra
Indian Hindus
Marathi-language singers
Gwalior gharana
20th-century Indian male classical singers